This is a list of elections in Canada in 2011. Included are provincial, municipal and federal elections, by-elections on any level, referendums and party leadership races at any level.

January to April
February 1 - 2011 Lethbridge municipal by-election
February 15 - Provincial by-election in Humber West, Newfoundland and Labrador
February 26 - 2011 British Columbia Liberal Party leadership election
April 2 - 2011 Progressive Conservative Party of Newfoundland and Labrador leadership election
April 16 - 2011 New Brunswick New Democratic Party leadership election
April 17 - 2011 British Columbia New Democratic Party leadership election

May to August
May 2 - 2011 federal election
May 11 - Provincial by-election in Vancouver-Point Grey, British Columbia
May 28 
2011 Alberta Party leadership election
2011 British Columbia Conservative Party leadership election
May 2011 Liberal Party of Newfoundland and Labrador leadership election
2011 Yukon Party leadership election
June 6 - Lacombe County, Alberta municipal by-election, 2011
June 21 - Cape Breton North provincial by-election, Nova Scotia
June 13—August 5 - 2011 British Columbia sales tax referendum
August 14 - August 2011 Liberal Party of Newfoundland and Labrador leadership election

September to December
September 10 - 2011 Alberta Liberal Party leadership election
September 12 - Territorial by-election in Iqaluit West, Nunavut
September 17 & October 1 - 2011 Progressive Conservative Association of Alberta leadership election
September 19 - 2011 Mississauga Ward 5 by-election
October 3
 2011 Prince Edward Island general election
 2011 Northwest Territories general election
October 4 - 2011 Manitoba general election
October 6 - 2011 Ontario general election
October 11
 2011 Newfoundland and Labrador general election
 2011 Yukon general election
November 2 - Saskatchewan municipal elections for even-numbered rural municipalities
November 7 - 2011 Saskatchewan general election
November 19 - 2011 British Columbia municipal elections
December 5 – Provincial by-election in Bonaventure, Quebec
December 11 - 2011 Bloc Québécois leadership election

References

See also
Municipal elections in Canada
Elections in Canada

 
Political timelines of the 2010s by year